Shadow bands are thin, wavy lines of alternating light and dark that can be seen moving and undulating in parallel on plain-coloured surfaces immediately before and after a total solar eclipse. They are caused by the refraction by Earth's atmospheric turbulence of the solar crescent as it thins to a narrow slit, which increasingly collimates the light reaching Earth in the minute just before and after totality. 

The shadows' detailed structure is due to random patterns of fine air turbulence that refract the collimated sunlight arriving from the narrow eclipse crescent.

The bands' rapid sliding motion is due to shifting air currents combined with the angular motion of the sun projecting through higher altitudes.  The degree of collimation in the light gradually increases as the crescent thins, until the solar disk is completely covered and the eclipse is total. 

Stars twinkle for the same reason. They are so far from Earth that they appear as point sources of light easily disturbed by Earth's atmospheric turbulence which acts like lenses and prisms diverting the light's path. Viewed toward the collimated light of a star, the shadows bands from atmospheric refraction pass over the eye.

History 

 In the 9th century CE, shadow bands during a total solar eclipse were described for the first time – in the Völuspá, part of the old Icelandic poetic edda.
 In 1820, Hermann Goldschmidt of Germany noted shadow bands visible just before and after totality at some eclipses.

 In 1842, George B. Airy, the English astronomer royal, saw his first total eclipse of the sun. He recalled shadow bands as one of the highlights: "As the totality approached, a strange fluctuation of light was seen upon the walls and the ground, so striking that in some places children ran after it and tried to catch it with their hands."

 In 1905, Catherine Octavia Stevens observed shadow bands at the start of the total eclipse of August 30 at Cas Català, Majorca. "As to the character of their appearance and mode of progression, it was observed that they swept along with a flight that was at once rapid and orderly, there was no confusion of the wavy lines with one another, but all bore along in one and the same direction in parallel formation, traversing the ground as water-wave reflections may be seen to do on the under surface of a boat, only that there seemed in the case of the shadow-bands to be a more distinct expression of a forward movement." Clouds prevent observations after totality.

 In 2008, British astrophysicist Stuart Eves speculated that shadow bands might be an effect of infrasound, which involves the shadow of the moon travelling at supersonic speed and inducing an atmospheric shock wave. However, astronomy professor Barrie Jones, an expert on shadow bands, stated, "The [accepted] theory works; there's no need to seek an alternative."

References

Light
Solar eclipses